Reginald George Hart (5 January 1936 – 18 January 2019) was a New Zealand rugby league footballer. A  forward, he was a member of the Kiwis on their 1961–62 tour of Great Britain and France. On that tour, he made eight appearances, including in the test match victory against France in Perpignan.

Hart was born on 5 January 1936, and died in Christchurch on 18 January 2019.

References

1936 births
2019 deaths
New Zealand rugby league players
New Zealand national rugby league team players
Rugby league second-rows